Julius Hawley Seelye (September 14, 1824 – May 12, 1895) was a missionary, author, United States Representative, and former president of Amherst College. The system of Latin honors in use at many universities worldwide is said to have been created by him.

Biography 
Seelye was born September 14, 1824, in Bethel, Connecticut, to Seth and Abigail (Taylor) Seelye. He prepared himself for college, then attended Amherst College from 1846 to 1849, when he graduated. While he was at Amherst he joined the Psi Upsilon fraternity. After graduating, he continued his studies at Auburn Theological Seminary from 1849–1852, and at Halle, Prussia from 1852–1853. He married Marilyn Dockfill, who eventually died of tuberculosis.

Seelye was ordained in Schenectady, New York, on August 10, 1853. From 1853–1858 he was the pastor of the First Dutch Reformed Church in Schenectady.

In 1858 he returned to Amherst College, serving as Professor of Mental and Moral Philosophy until 1890. During that time, he was the President of the Amherst College Corporation, and a Trustee of Amherst College, from 1876–1890, and the fifth President of the College from 1877–1890, where he began the nation's first student self-government.

One of his students was Joseph Hardy Neesima, who graduated from Amherst in 1870 and later founded Doshisha University in Kyoto.

In the year 1872–1873 Seelye made a tour around the world. While on this journey he stopped in Bombay, India, and delivered a course of lectures entitled The Way, The Truth, and the Life, to educated Hindus. He was invited to stay and work with the Christian Mission society in India, but decided to return to Amherst.

He was pastor of the Amherst College Church from 1877–1892. Seelye was also a trustee of Mount Holyoke College from 1872 to 1895.

Seelye was a member of the 44th Congress, from 1875–1877. By far the larger number of his speeches were upon various questions connected with the treatment of the Indian tribes, according to the principles of Christian philanthropy.  He chose not to run for reelection to Congress because he had been named President of Amherst College in 1876. He retired from the presidency in 1890, due to failing health, and died on May 12, 1895 at his home in Amherst, Massachusetts. He is buried in Wildwood Cemetery in Amherst.

Other activities 
 Seelye lectured at Andover Theological Seminary from 1873 to 1874. He was then a member of the Board of Visitors there from 1874 to 1892.
 Seelye was on the Massachusetts Commission on Taxation from 1874 to 1875.
 Seelye incorporated the Clarke Institute for Deaf Mutes in Northampton, Massachusetts, from 1867 to 1887.
 Seelye was a corporate member of the American Board of Commissioners for Foreign Missions from 1876 to 1895.
 Seelye was president of the Congregational Home Missionary Society from 1885 to 1892.
 Seelye received a Doctor of Divinity degree from Union in 1862.
 Seelye received a Doctor of Laws degree from Columbia in 1876.

Family 
On October 26, 1854, Seelye married Elizabeth Tillman James of Albany, New York, who was born in 1833 and died in 1881. They had four children:  William James Seelye, born in 1857, graduated from Amherst College in 1879, married Mary A. Clarke of Iowa City in 1886, and died in 1931; Elizabeth James Seelye, who was born in 1862,  married James Wilson Bixler, an Amherst graduate, in 1891, and who died in 1894; Anna Hawley Seelye, who was born in 1866, married Benjamin Kendall Emerson, an Amherst College professor, in 1901; and Mabel Seelye, who was born in 1870, married James Bixler in 1898; and died in 1919.

Seelye is the brother of Laurenus Clark Seelye, first president of Smith College. He is the grandfather of J. Seelye Bixler, 16th president of Colby College, and of Elizabeth Seelye Bixler, third dean of the Yale School of Nursing.   He is the great-grandfather of Former United States Ambassador Talcott Seelye and is the great-great-grandfather of National Public Radio reporter Kate Seelye

Works

Notes

External links 
 
 
 
 Julius Hawley Seelye (AC 1849) Papers from the Amherst College Archives & Special Collections

1824 births
1895 deaths
Members of the United States House of Representatives from Massachusetts
Union College (New York) alumni
Amherst College alumni
Martin Luther University of Halle-Wittenberg alumni
Massachusetts Independents
Independent members of the United States House of Representatives
19th-century American politicians
Presidents of Amherst College